Balkhash Radar Station (also described as Sary Shagan radar node and Balkhash-9) is the site of two generations of Soviet and Russian early warning radars. It is located on the west coast of  Lake Balkhash near Sary Shagan test site in Kazakhstan. Although it was used for monitoring satellites in low Earth orbit it was mainly a key part of the Russian system of warning against missile attack. It provided coverage of western and central China, India, Pakistan and submarine missile launches in the Bay of Bengal. There have been six radars at this site, the last one was removed from service on 1 June 2020, and it was run by the Russian Aerospace Defence Forces.

The military town for the station is called Balkhash-9.

Space surveillance

Balkhash was founded as OS-2, a space surveillance site with four Dnestr (NATO codename "Hen House") radar stations, which were started in 1964  and tested in 1968. The prototype Dnestr radar, TsSO-P, was built nearby on the Sary Shagan test site .

In 1967-8 a Dnepr early warning radar was started adjacent to the 4 Dnestr radars and it was commissioned in the early 1970s.

The Dnepr radar was the last functioning radar on the site.

Second generation Daryal radar

The system is a VHF system operating at a wavelength of 1.5 to 2 meters (150 to 200 MHz).

Originally, at least seven Daryal facilities were planned, however, only the first two facilities completed, Pechora and Gabala, were ever operational. Two Daryal-U type were to be built at Balkhash and Mishelevka, Irkutsk, neither were completed before the collapse of the Soviet Union.

The Balkhash Daryal started in 1982. Some testing started in 1991 and then stopped in 1994. In 2002 the never operational radar transferred to Kazakhstan who were left with the responsibility to demolish it. The radar was heavily looted and the receiver building ("building no. 2") burnt down in September 2004. It further collapsed whilst being looted in January 2010, killing one.

The Daryal contained organic pollutant polychlorinated biphenyl in its capacitors. The Kazakh government allocated $7 million to dispose of these and former Kazakh environment minister Nurlan Iskakov was convicted of embezzlement and sentenced to four years in prison relating to this money in 2009.

References

External links
Set of photos from inside the Balkhash Dnepr from Novosti Kosmonavtiki 
Set of photos of the Daryal fire

Russian Space Forces
Russian and Soviet military radars
Military installations of Russia in other countries
Military installations of the Soviet Union
Karaganda Region